Bainbridge is an unincorporated community and census-designated place (CDP) in Conoy Township, Lancaster County, Pennsylvania, United States, with a ZIP code of 17502. Bainbridge is located along Pennsylvania Route 441. As of the 2010 census the population was 1,355.

Before European settlement, Bainbridge was the site of a Conoy village in the first decades of the 18th century, possibly called Conejoholo.

History
Bainbridge became home to the Conoy and Nanticoke tribes in the early 1700s when English settlers pushed them out of their original homes. Before the move, the Conoys lived in the area that is now Baltimore, and the Nanticokes lived across the Chesapeake Bay in what is now Delaware. In 1632, there were about 2,500 among the tribes, and by 1697 there were only about 300 due to diseases brought over by the English.

Geography
Bainbridge is in western Lancaster County, in the southern part of Conoy Township. Pennsylvania Route 441 passes through the community northeast of the downtown, leading northwest (upstream along the Susquehanna River)  to Middletown and southeast (downstream)  to Columbia.

Demographics

Tourism

White Cliffs

The White Cliffs of Conoy, south of Bainbridge, are open to the public. The cliffs look out over the Susquehanna River and are the direct result of a limestone quarry.

Koser Park

The trail goes through Marietta and Columbia.

References 

Census-designated places in Lancaster County, Pennsylvania
Census-designated places in Pennsylvania